Pamela Adelaide Genevieve Grey, Viscountess Grey of Fallodon (born Wyndham; later Pamela Tennant, Baroness Glenconner; 14 January 1871 – 18 November 1928), was an English writer. The wife of Edward Tennant, 1st Baron Glenconner, and later of Edward Grey, 1st Viscount Grey of Fallodon, she is one of the Wyndham Sisters by John Singer Sargent which were at the centre of the cultural and political life of their time. Like their parents, they were part of The Souls.

Early life
Wyndham was born on 14 January 1871 at Clouds House in Salisbury, Wiltshire, England. She was the daughter of Percy Wyndham (1835–1911) and Madeline Caroline Frances Eden Campbell. Her mother was the daughter of Sir Guy Campbell, 1st Baronet, and his wife Pamela FitzGerald, daughter of Lord Edward FitzGerald and Pamela Syms. Her father was the son of George Wyndham, 1st Baron Leconfield, and his wife Mary Fanny Blunt, the daughter of Reverend William Blunt.

The 1899 portrait of Pamela and her sisters (Mary, wife of the 11th Earl of Wemyss, and Madeline, wife of Charles Adeane, the Lord Lt. of Cambridgeshire) by John Singer Sargent, known as the Wyndham sisters, has been described as "the greatest picture of modern times" by The Times.

Career
In 1919, Wyndham published the successful memoirs of her son Edward Tennant, who had been killed during World War I. She also published poems, prose, children's literature, and edited poetry and prose anthologies.

She was friends, among others, with Henry James, Oscar Wilde and Edward Burne-Jones, and was part of the "poetic and literary circle known as The Souls". In 1912, she hosted three lectures by Ezra Pound in her private art gallery. One her greatest friends was Edith Olivier; Olivier was a year younger than Wyndham, and they were childhood friends.

Personal life
In 1895, she married Edward Tennant (1859–1920), who was educated at Eton and at Trinity College, Cambridge. Edward was the eldest surviving son of eleven children born to Sir Charles Tennant, 1st Baronet, and succeeded to his father's baronetcy upon his death in 1906. In 1911, he was raised to the peerage as Baron Glenconner, of The Glen in the County of Peebles. From 1908 until his death in 1920, he served as Lord Lieutenant of Peeblesshire. His sister, Margot Tennant, was married to H. H. Asquith, Prime Minister from 1894 until 1928. Together, they were the parents of:

 Clarissa Madeline Georgiana Felicite Tennant (1896–1960), who married Adrian Bethell, then Lionel Tennyson, 3rd Baron Tennyson, then James M. Beck Jr.
 Edward Tennant (1897–1916), the war poet who was killed at the Battle of the Somme.
 Christopher Grey Tennant, 2nd Baron Glenconner (1899–1983), who married Pamela Paget, the daughter of Sir Richard Paget, 2nd Baronet.
 David Pax Tennant (1902–1968), a socialite who founded the Gargoyle Club in London.
 Stephen James Napier Tennant (1906–1987), a socialite known for his decadent lifestyle who was called "the brightest" of the "Bright Young People".

In 1922, she married the widower Edward Grey, 1st Viscount Grey of Fallodon (1862–1933), the Liberal statesman who served as a Member of Parliament, Secretary of State for Foreign Affairs (under Asquith), and the British Ambassador to the United States.

Viscountess Grey died on 18 November 1928 at Wilsford Manor in Wilsford cum Lake, near Salisbury. The house had been built in 1904–1906 during her first marriage.

Her second husband died on 7 September 1933 and the viscountcy became extinct on his death, though he was succeeded in the baronetcy by his cousin, Sir George Grey.

In popular culture
The 2014 book Those Wild Wyndhams: Three Sisters at the Heart of Power by Claudia Renton is about the lives of the Wyndham sisters, Mary, Madeline, and Pamela.

Works
Windlestraw: A book of verse, 1905

The Children and The Pictures, 1907 published by Heinemann

The White Wallet, 1912, republished in 1928 with illustrations by Stephen Tennant
The Story of Joan Arc, 1915
The Saving of the Children, 1918
Edward Wyndham Tennant: a memoir by his mother Pamela Glenconner, 1919
Shepherd's Crowns: a volume of essays, 1923

References
Notes

Sources

External links
 

1871 births
1928 deaths
20th-century British women writers
British women poets
British women children's writers
20th-century British poets
British memoirists
People from Wiltshire
Tennant family
Pamela Wyndham
English socialites
British women memoirists
Glenconner
Grey of Fallodon
20th-century British writers